Tommy Lalande (31 December 1904 – 31 January 1983) was a South African long-distance runner. He competed in the marathon at the 1936 Summer Olympics.

References

1904 births
1983 deaths
Athletes (track and field) at the 1936 Summer Olympics
South African male long-distance runners
South African male marathon runners
Olympic athletes of South Africa
Sportspeople from Durban